The Battle of Italeni was a battle that took place at  in what is now KwaZulu Natal province, South Africa, between the Voortrekkers and the Zulus during the period of the Great Trek.

Background

After the massacre of Piet Retief and his men by Dingane on 6 February 1838, a number of Voortrekker camps were also attacked by the Zulu impis. These Voortrekkers appealed to other treks, particularly those of Piet Uys and Hendrik Potgieter in the Orange Free State, for help. Both treks sent out commandos to help. The two groups met on the banks of the Blaukraans River, where a council of war was held. During this meeting Uys was elected as "General Field Commandant" by those present - becoming, in effect, the first elected Boer Commandant-General. Potgieter—a natural leader—objected to this and stated that he and his men were not prepared to serve under any other leader. As a compromise, it was decided that each commando would remain under its own leader, but that both parties would fight together. This arrangement would prove to have disastrous consequences.

The battle

The two commandos (347 men) set out in two separate columns, on 5 and 6 April 1838. On 9 April, near the Babanango Mountain Range, they saw a large Zulu impi and took a number of them captive (although it has been speculated that these may have been spies sent to lead them into a trap). The captives told the Voortrekkers that the main Zulu army was encamped near Umgungundlovu - the capital of their king, Dingane.

As a result of this information, Uys led the parties directly to the Zulu capital and approximately 6.4 kilometres from Umgungundlovu they encountered the main Zulu army, at a mountain defile guarding the approaches to the Zulu capital. On each of the two hills at the end of the defile an impi was stationed, and another one waited in the valley between them, totaling around 8,000 warriors. Uys gave Potgieter a choice as to which impi he would like to attack. Potgieter chose the one in the valley, while Uys decided to attack the hill towards his right.

After riding to within 36 metres of the Zulu force, Uys ordered his men to dismount and open fire. Volleys from the Voortrekkers decimated the first two lines of the impi, while the third turned and fled. The battle appeared won.

On his side Potgieter made what was reported as a "half-hearted" attack on the Zulu forces, and then retired. However, 16 members of his commando attacked the Zulus at the base of the hill on the left, riding close and firing at them. The Zulus charged this small party, who turned and fled. One man was killed on the Voortrekker side. After the survivors of the attack reached the rest of Potgieter's commando, they mounted and left the battlefield. This gave the remaining Zulu impis the opportunity to attack Uys' commando from the rear. Uys saw the Zulu force advancing and sent Gert Rudolph, the voortrekker leader that had replaced the ailing Gert Maritz, to Potgieter to request him to cover his rear. However, Potgieter ignored this request and continued retreating. The action of sending Rudolph as a messenger to Potgieter almost certainly saved Rudolph's life.

Meanwhile, two members of Uys' party (the Malan brothers) had become isolated from the rest of the commando while pursuing the fleeing Zulus and were being led into an ambush in a bushy gorge. Seeing the danger they were in, Uys wanted his whole commando to ride to their rescue. Most of the members considered this too risky, and refused. In response, Uys formed a party of fifteen volunteers (including his son, Dirkie) and rode to their rescue.  During the subsequent fighting Uys, his son, the Malan brothers as well as five of the volunteers were killed (for  ten Voortrekker dead during the battle).

The part of Uys' commando that remained behind (under the command of Field Cornet Potgieter), were surrounded and had to fight their way out.

Due to the outcome of the battle, the Voortrekker forces involved in the fighting subsequently became known as the Vlugkommando (Flight Commando).

Aftermath

The commandos returned to their camp on 12 April. During a subsequent meeting of the Voortrekkers, Potgieter was accused of cowardice and treachery for his refusal to endanger his commando in an attempt to rescue Uys' party. In vain, Potgieter argued that if he had attacked, he and his men would also have died at Italeni. In disgust at the cries of "traitor", Potgieter and his followers left and returned to the Orange Free State.

However, it has been speculated that, without the lessons learnt as a result of the Battle of Italeni - such as fighting from the shelter of ox-wagons whenever possible and choosing the place of battle rather than being enticed into unfavourable terrain - the Voortrekkers would not have succeeded in finally beating the Zulus at the Battle of Blood River eight months later.

Site of the battle

The exact site of the battle remains unknown and has been the subject of some controversy. However, the most likely area lies in a mountain defile guarded by two hills that is approximately 4.8 kilometres southwest of Umgungundlovu. It has been speculated that the Zulus named it the "Battle of Italeni" as some of the fighting took place at Itala Mountain, 24 kilometres away.
There is a place called Ithaleni or Ethaleni in Nkandla KwaZulu-Natal. The locals believe this is exactly where the 1838 battle took place. Here are places named from this hill. Ithala, Thaleni and Thalaneni.

Today, the site features two schools: Thalaneni Primary School and Ithala High School. A monument is erected at the hilltop.

See also
Military history of South Africa

References

Italeni
Great Trek
Italeni
Italeni
19th century in Africa
1838 in South Africa
History of KwaZulu-Natal